Stephen Decatur Lindsey (March 3, 1828 – April 26, 1884) was a nineteenth-century politician and lawyer from Maine.

Born in Norridgewock, Maine, Lindsey attended the common schools as a child and attended Broomfield Academy. He studied law and was admitted to the bar in Norridgewock in 1853. He was a member of the Maine House of Representatives in 1856, a clerk of the judicial courts of Somerset County, Maine from 1857 to 1860, and a delegate to the Republican National Convention in 1860.

Lindsey served in the Maine Senate from 1868 to 1870, sitting as its president in 1869, and he was once again a delegate to the Republican National Convention in 1868. He was a member of the Executive Council of Maine in 1874 before being elected as a Republican to the United States House of Representatives in 1876, where he served from 1877 to 1883, but he was not a candidate for renomination in 1882. Afterwards, he resumed practicing law, and he continued practicing until his death in Norridgewock on April 26, 1884. He was interred in River View Cemetery in Norridgewock.

External links

1828 births
1884 deaths
Republican Party members of the Maine House of Representatives
Presidents of the Maine Senate
Republican Party Maine state senators
Maine lawyers
People from Norridgewock, Maine
Members of the Executive Council of Maine
Republican Party members of the United States House of Representatives from Maine
19th-century American politicians
19th-century American lawyers